Giuseppe Leo (born 30 January 1995) is a German-Italian professional footballer who plays as a defender.

References

Living people
1995 births
Footballers from Munich
German footballers
Italian footballers
Association football defenders
3. Liga players
Regionalliga players
Swiss Challenge League players
FC Ingolstadt 04 II players
FC Bayern Munich II players
Karlsruher SC players
FC Aarau players
German expatriate footballers
German expatriate sportspeople in Switzerland
Expatriate footballers in Switzerland